CoHive, formerly known as EV Hive is a former coworking space based in Indonesia, providing flexible workspace, business services and networking for entrepreneurs and startups.

The company counts several venture capital funds among its investors, including East Ventures, Sinar Mas Digital Ventures (SMDV), Insignia Ventures, Intudo Ventures and Jacumen Investments. The company announced its bankruptcy and its closure in 2023.

History 
CoHive was founded in 2015, when it was originally known as EV Hive (East Ventures' Hive). It started as a part-time initiative from funding firm East Ventures to provide a working place for its portfolios. Soon after that, it realized that the initiative actually similar to a business model called co-working space, and decided to continue the initiative.

In the beginning, EV Hive only had two locations in South Jakarta and one in BSD City.

On 15 May 2017, EV Hive announced the acquisition of pre-series A funding of US$0.8 million as well as the appointment of Carlson Lau as Chief Executive Officer (CEO), Jason Lee as Chief Financial Officer (CFO) and Ethan Choi as Chief Strategy Officer (CSO).

In September 2017, EV Hive received additional funding from Insignia Venture Partners and other investors including Intudo Ventures, East Ventures and SMDV. In November, the company announced a merger with Clapham Collective, a coworking space in Medan, as well as the opening of the first EV Hive branch in Medan. By then, the company had nine locations in Jakarta, Tangerang and Medan.

In June 2019, EV Hive rebranded as CoHive. At the same time, it also announced that it raised US$13.5 million in a new round of funding led by Korea's Stonebridge Ventures. Right now, CoHive is present in 31 locations covering approximately 65,000 square meters in Jakarta, Medan, Yogyakarta, and Bali, including an 18 storeys building that can house up to 2,700 members.

Closure 
CoHive declared bankruptcy on January 18, 2023 and announced the closure of its business on February 7, 2023. The company stated that the bankruptcy is caused by the long term effect of COVID-19 pandemic, the high availability of office space, and the lack of financing opportunities.

References 

Service companies of Indonesia
Real estate companies established in 2015
Indonesian companies established in 2015
Defunct companies of Indonesia